DZWM (864 AM) is a radio station owned and operated by Alaminos Community Broadcasting Corporation, the media arm of the Roman Catholic Diocese of Alaminos. The station's studio and transmitter are located inside the grounds of St. Joseph Cathedral, Brgy. Poblacion, Alaminos, Pangasinan.

References

Radio stations in Dagupan
Radio stations established in 1985
Catholic radio stations
1985 establishments in the Philippines